The 2008 World Rally Championship was the 36th season of the FIA World Rally Championship. The season consisted of 15 rallies and began on 24 January, with the 2008 Monte Carlo Rally.
Frenchman Sébastien Loeb successfully retained the Drivers' World Championship, his and co-driver Daniel Elena's record-breaking fifth consecutive title, all of them attained driving Citroëns. In addition, Citroën secured their fourth Manufacturers' title, and their first since 2005, from 2006 and 2007 victors, Ford.

Rule changes

The running order for the first day is governed by championship position, with the championship leader running first on the road. For every other day of a rally, the order is decided by the previous end of day classification (with the leader on classification running first). The term 'leg' has been replaced by 'day' in order to sound more understandable. Extra 10-minute service prior to the finish podium has been added, intended to allow the service park to remain an attraction until the end of the event.

With the switch to Pirelli tyres, tyre mousse (along with all anti-deflation devices) has been banned, and fewer compounds are available. Also the teams aren't allowed to modify tyres by themselves (e.g. by making additional cuts) anymore. At the first event of the season, the available tires were the soft slick DS tire (Pirelli PZero), the WX snow tire without studs, and the WX snow tire with studs (both variants of Pirelli Sottozero). The same snow tyres were used in Sweden as well. Later on loose surface tyres were introduced: Pirelli Scorpion, available in two variants – hard compound for abrasive surfaces, such as roads in Mexico or Greece, and soft one, for more muddy stages as seen on Welsh event. Tire walls have been strengthened in order to endure long, rough gravel stages often full of sharp rocks. The tread on Scorpions is asymmetric and directional, as it has proven more efficient during the tests.

Calendar

The 2008 championship was contested over fifteen rounds in Europe, North America, the Middle East, Asia, South America and Oceania.

The 2008 season included 15 rallies, which was one less than the 2007 season. Rally Norway, Rally Portugal and Rally Ireland were dropped from the calendar for 2008. Rally of Turkey returned to the schedule, and Jordan Rally was part of the calendar for the first time. Rally Australia was planned to make a return after being absent in 2007, but the organizers submitted a request to the FIA to delay the event's return to the schedule until 2009.

The events also part of the Production World Rally Championship were Sweden, Argentina, Greece, Turkey, Finland, New Zealand, Japan and GB. The seven rallies also on the Junior World Rally Championship schedule were Mexico, Jordan, Italy, Finland, Germany, Spain and France.

Teams and drivers
In 2008 two categories are valid to compete for the Manufacturer's championship:

Manufacturer (M)
must take part in all the rallies of the Championship with two cars of the same make
must enter only cars corresponding to the latest homologated version of a World Rally Car in conformity with the 2008 Appendix J
must inform the FIA of the name of the first driver entered for the season at the time of registration for the Championship. No change of the first driver is authorised, except in a case of force majeure. The driver of the second car may be changed for each of the rallies in the Championship

Manufacturer Team (MT)
must take part in a minimum of 10 Championship rallies with two cars of the same make; those rallies must be nominated on registering for the Championship
cannot enter World Rally Cars homologated during the year 2008 and cannot use parts homologated after 2 January 2008
can only score points in the events it nominated on registering.

The teams and drivers for the 2008 season are as follows:

 – indicates a car running with varying numbers during the season

J-WRC entries

P-WRC entries

All entries utilized Pirelli tyres.

Events
The Rally Finland is notable this year for having dropped its famous Ouninpohja stage. This has been done for safety reasons, however this is likely to be a huge disappointment for race fans.

Standings

Drivers' championship

 Sébastien Loeb secured the drivers' championship title in Japan.

Manufacturers' championship

 Citroën secured the manufacturers' championship in Wales.

Junior championship

Production championship
Points table:

References

External links

2008 calendar at WRC.com
 FIA World Rally Championship 2008 at ewrc-results.com

World Rally Championship seasons
World Rally Championship